Sturisomatichthys reinae is a species of catfish in the family Loricariidae. It is native to South America, where it occurs in the Baudó River basin in Colombia. The species was described in 2019 by Alejandro Londoño-Burbano (of the Federal University of Rio de Janeiro) and Roberto E. Reis (of the Pontifical Catholic University of Rio Grande do Sul) as part of a taxonomic revision of the genus Sturisomatichthys.

Sturisomatichthys reinae appears in the aquarium trade, where it is frequently referred to as the royal twig catfish. It is often confused with the related species Sturisomatichthys aureum.

References 

Harttiini
Fish described in 2019
Catfish of South America
Fish of Colombia